Humaria is a genus of fungi in the family Pyronemataceae. The genus is widespread in northern temperate areas, and contains 16 species. The genus was circumscribed by Karl Wilhelm Gottlieb Leopold Fuckel in 1870.

Species
Humaria aurantia
Humaria haemastigma
Humaria hemisphaerica
Humaria irregularis
Humaria menieri
Humaria novozeelandica
Humaria ollaris
Humaria solsequia
Humaria stromella
Humaria velenovskyi
Humaria violascens

References

Pyronemataceae
Pezizales genera
Taxa named by Karl Wilhelm Gottlieb Leopold Fuckel
Taxa described in 1870